Christopher David Bell (born December 16, 1994) is an American professional stock car racing driver. He competes full-time in the NASCAR Cup Series, driving the No. 20 Toyota Camry for Joe Gibbs Racing, and part-time in the NASCAR Craftsman Truck Series, driving the No. 61 Toyota Tundra for Hattori Racing Enterprises. He is the 2017 NASCAR Camping World Truck Series Champion.

Racing career

Early career and dirt track racing

Bell began his racing career in micro sprints at I-44 Riverside Speedway in the early 2000s. He earned the Lucas Oil ASCS2 Championship in 2010 before winning the 66 Mike Phillips Memorial micro-sprint car race in 2011. The following year, he finished second in the Short Track Nationals at I-30 Speedway, a race sanctioned by the American Sprint Car Series. In 2013, he joined Keith Kunz Motorsports in USAC racing, replacing Kyle Larson. On October 31, he joined CH Motorsports' sprint car racing program. Bell concluded 2013 as the USAC National Midget Champion. In 2014, he began racing asphalt Super Late Models for Kyle Busch Motorsports, including competing in the World of Outlaws Sprint Car Series. On May 7, he won his first career WoO Sprint Car Series race at Jacksonville Speedway. As a Super Late Model driver, he won races at New Smyrna Speedway, South Alabama Speedway and Southern National Motorsports Park. During the year, he won 24 USAC Midget races and 26 total dirt races, including the Turkey Night Grand Prix.

In 2017, Bell won the Chili Bowl Nationals, becoming the first Oklahoman to win the event since Andy Hillenburg in 1994. Bell followed the 2017 Chili Bowl win with his third consecutive Turnpike Challenge victory, the most recent win coming at his hometown track I-44 Riverside Speedway in Oklahoma City. He finished the 2017 season with a win in the Tulsa Shootout's Winged Outlaw Division.

He won the Chili Bowl again in 2018 and 2019 to become only the third three-time winner of the race.

NASCAR
In 2015, Bell made two NASCAR K&N Pro Series West starts at Irwindale Speedway and Iowa Speedway, driving the No. 54 for Bill McAnally Racing; he finished 15th and second, respectively. In June, Bell returned to Iowa to make his Camping World Truck Series debut for KBM in the American Ethanol 200. Bell finished second to KBM teammate Erik Jones in the race's practice session, and finished fifth in the race. On July 8, Bell was announced as Justin Boston's replacement in the No. 54 at Kentucky Speedway. Bell won his first career Truck race in the Mudsummer Classic at Eldora Speedway after holding off Bobby Pierce on the green–white–checker finish.

On October 29, 2015, KBM announced that Bell would compete full-time in the Truck Series in 2016. His season started on a terrifying note at Daytona, when on the final lap, Brandon Brown pushed Timothy Peters into him causing his truck to spin. His truck gripped the track, causing it to go on two wheels before it launched into the air and barrel-rolled multiple times. The following week at Atlanta Motor Speedway, Bell was leading the race on his way to win, when he blew a tire and crashed into the wall, ending his day. He would have one lone win in 2016 at Gateway. He would finish third in the final standings.

In 2017, Bell won the second race of the season at Atlanta after winning the first two stages and passing Matt Crafton for the lead with 16 laps remaining. In May, Bell made his Pinty's Series and Xfinity Series debuts; in the former, he drove the No. 22 for 22 Racing at the season-opening race at Canadian Tire Motorsport Park. In the latter, he joined the No. 18 of Joe Gibbs Racing at Charlotte Motor Speedway as part of a seven-race schedule. He also drove the No. 20 at Iowa and Richmond International Raceway before returning to the No. 18 to drive at Kansas Speedway, Texas Motor Speedway, Phoenix International Raceway and Homestead-Miami Speedway. At Mosport, he was the lone American in the field as he finished 23rd after suffering a brake failure.

In his Xfinity debut, Bell got an impressive 4th-place finish despite being spun out early in the race by Ryan Reed. During his second start at Iowa, Bell won the pole and looked on track for his 1st career win. Unfortunately, he was caught up in a multi-car crash late when he got turned while leading by the lap car of Ross Chastain following a crash between the lapped cars of Ryan Reed and Brennan Poole which collected Bell and Chastain. The previous night, in the Truck race, he was also on track for a win but dropped back late and finished 5th. At Kentucky, Bell recovered from an early spin and outraced John Hunter Nemechek and Brandon Jones for his third truck win of the season and fifth of his career. Bell won his first Xfinity race in his fifth start at Kansas after catching and passing Erik Jones in the final laps. On November 17, Bell won the 2017 Truck Series championship by finishing second to his friend Chase Briscoe and being the best finisher among the Championship 4 of Bell, Crafton, Johnny Sauter, and Austin Cindric. Bell ended his Truck Series season with 5 wins, 15 top 5s, and 21 top tens to win the championship.

In 2018, Bell moved to the Xfinity Series full-time to drive the No. 20 car for Joe Gibbs Racing. Bell won his first race of the season at Richmond in April, holding off teammate Noah Gragson. In July, Bell won three consecutive races at Kentucky, New Hampshire, and Iowa, becoming the first series regular since Dale Earnhardt Jr. in 1999 to win three consecutive races. Bell entered the Xfinity Series playoffs by winning at Richmond in September for the season sweep of the track. With this win, Bell would advance to the next round of the playoffs. Bell won his sixth race of the season at Dover in October, setting a rookie win record in the Xfinity Series. Bell won at the ISM Raceway on November 10, advancing to the Championship 4 after being in a must-win situation after poor finishes in the two prior races at Kansas and Texas. Bell finished 11th at Homestead and 4th in points.

Bell returned for his second full-time season in Xfinity competition in 2019. He started with a sixth at Daytona, and the following week won at Atlanta in dominating fashion. The win at Atlanta was the first win for the Toyota Supra since the Camry was the model used when Toyota joined both the Xfinity and Cup Series in 2007. Bell won his second race of the season at Bristol in April, where he also won the $100,000 Dash 4 Cash bonus. Bell won once again at Dover, winning his second Dash 4 Cash bonus. Bell won his fourth race of the season at Iowa in June.

On June 28, 2019, Bell signed a contract extension with JGR through 2020. In the following day's Camping World 300 at Chicagoland, Bell finished third but was disqualified after failing post-race inspection, relegating him to 38th. Bell won races at New Hampshire in July and Road America in August, the latter of which was his first road course win in the Xfinity Series. In September, Bell won the first race of the playoffs at Richmond, advancing to the next round. In November Bell would win at Texas Motor Speedway and would punch his ticket into the championship round at Homestead-Miami Speedway for the second year in a row. He finished the 2019 season third in points after finishing fifth at Homestead.

On September 24, 2019, Leavine Family Racing announced that Bell would drive the No. 95 Toyota in the Cup Series starting in 2020. In addition, his Xfinity crew chief Jason Ratcliff joined him in the team. In LFR's final season, Bell scored two top fives and seven top tens. He would end up finishing 20th in points and earned a drive in the No. 20 at Joe Gibbs Racing for 2021.

In his second race in JGR's No. 20, the 2021 O'Reilly Auto Parts 253 on Daytona's road course, he passed Joey Logano with two laps remaining to score his first career Cup victory. He became the first driver from Oklahoma to win a Cup Series race, the 35th driver to win a NASCAR race in all three main series, and the 100th winner in NASCAR's modern era. In July, he returned to the Xfinity Series at New Hampshire, where he led 151 of 200 laps including the final 146 to win. During the playoffs, Bell made it to the Round of 12, but struggled with a poor finish at Las Vegas, yet he rebounded with a fifth-place finish at Talladega. Following the Charlotte Roval race, he was eliminated from the Round of 8. He finished the season 12th in the points standings.

Bell started the 2022 season with a 34th place finish at the Daytona 500. At Atlanta, he accidentally struck jackman David O'Dell during his pit stop. Bell crossed the finish line in second place, but he was penalized to a 23rd place finish for passing below the line on the final lap. Bell scored a win at New Hampshire to become the 14th different winner of the season. During the playoffs, Bell won at the Charlotte Roval to advance to the Round of 8 after being in a must win situation. At Las Vegas, Bell got caught between a wreck involving Kyle Larson and Bubba Wallace, resulting in a 34th place finish and being well below the playoff cutline. Bell won at Martinsville to make the Championship 4. He finished 10th at the Phoenix finale and a career-best third in the points standings.

CB Industries
On September 19, 2019, Bell in conjunction with fellow racer Chad Boat announced the formation of CB Industries, a World of Outlaws sprint car team fielding the No. 21 Mobil 1 Toyota for Christopher Bell. In the team's first-ever race on September 21, 2019, they won the Jim Ford Classic.

On August 13, 2019, the team won with Bell in their first-ever start in the World of Outlaws NOS Energy Drink Sprint Car Series at Tri-State Speedway.

Personal life

Bell got engaged to Morgan Kemenah in December 2018 after they had been dating for four and a half years, and they married in February 2020, weeks before the Daytona 500.

Motorsports career results

Stock car career summary

† As Bell was a guest driver, he was ineligible for championship points.

NASCAR
(key) (Bold – Pole position awarded by qualifying time. Italics – Pole position earned by points standings or practice time. * – Most laps led.)

Cup Series

Daytona 500

Xfinity Series

Craftsman Truck Series

 Season still in progress
 Ineligible for series points

K&N Pro Series West

Pinty's Series

ARCA Racing Series
(key) (Bold – Pole position awarded by qualifying time. Italics – Pole position earned by points standings or practice time. * – Most laps led.)

References

External links

 
 

Living people
1994 births
Sportspeople from Norman, Oklahoma
NASCAR drivers
ARCA Menards Series drivers
Racing drivers from Oklahoma
Racing drivers from Oklahoma City
World of Outlaws drivers
Kyle Busch Motorsports drivers
Joe Gibbs Racing drivers
NASCAR Truck Series champions
USAC Silver Crown Series drivers
NASCAR Truck Series regular season champions